John J. Tolson III (October 22, 1915 – December 2, 1991) was a lieutenant general in the United States Army. During the Vietnam War, he helped implement the airmobile concept use of helicopters in combat with the 1st Cavalry Division (Airmobile). Tolson credited the U.S Marines for first using helicopters to transport troops into combat in the Korean War, making the ground fight a three-dimensional war, thus freeing troops from the tyranny of terrain.

Born in New Bern, North Carolina, Tolson attended the University of North Carolina for one year before being appointed to the United States Military Academy in 1933. He graduated from West Point with a B.S. degree in 1937 and was commissioned as an infantry officer.

In World War II, John J. Tolson was a member of the 503rd Parachute Infantry Battalion and participated in every jump with that unit, including the recapture of Corregidor in 1945. He was awarded the Silver Star Medal, Bronze Star Medal, Air Medal and Purple Heart. After the war, Tolson was given command of the 325th Airborne Infantry Regiment, 82nd Airborne Division at Fort Bragg.

Tolson graduated from the British Staff College in 1951 and the U.S. Army War College in 1953. He completed fixed-wing and rotary-wing flight training in June 1957. Tolson then served as assistant commandant of the Army Aviation School for two years. He next served as Deputy Director of Army Aviation at the Pentagon until 1961, chief of the U.S. Military Assistance Advisory Group in Addis Ababa, Ethiopia from 1961 to 1963 and then Director of Army Aviation back at the Pentagon from 1963 to 1965. Tolson served as commander of the Army Aviation Center and commandant of the Army Aviation School from March 1965 to March 1967.

In the Vietnam War, Major General Tolson took command of 1st Cavalry Division in April 1967 and served in that capacity till July 14, 1969. Under his command, his division played crucial roles during the Tet Offensive during the Battle of Hue and at Quang Tri City in January 1968. It also participated in the second biggest battle of the war: Operation Pegasus the relief of the Marine Khe Sanh Combat Base in March 1968 where all three brigades engaged the enemy, as well as Operation Delaware, the massive air assault into the A Shau Valley in April 1968. He was awarded the Distinguished Service Cross, Distinguished Flying Cross and four more Air Medals.

After his Vietnam tour ended, Tolson was promoted to lieutenant general. He was given command of the XVIII Airborne Corps on August 1, 1968. Tolson was also presented the Master Army Aviator badge. He retired in 1973 as deputy commander of the Continental Army.

Tolson died on December 2, 1991 at the age of 76. He was survived by his wife, two sons and a daughter. Tolson was buried at Arlington National Cemetery on December 4, 1991.

His wife Margaret Jordan (Young) Tolson (July 5, 1922 – July 8, 2020) was interred beside him on September 17, 2020.

References

1915 births
1991 deaths
People from New Bern, North Carolina
University of North Carolina at Chapel Hill alumni
United States Military Academy alumni
United States Army personnel of World War II
Recipients of the Air Medal
Recipients of the Silver Star
Graduates of the Staff College, Camberley
United States Army War College alumni
American Master Army Aviators
Recipients of the Legion of Merit
United States Army generals
United States Army personnel of the Vietnam War
Recipients of the Distinguished Service Cross (United States)
Recipients of the Distinguished Flying Cross (United States)
Recipients of the Distinguished Service Medal (US Army)
People from Raleigh, North Carolina
Burials at Arlington National Cemetery